The Ruger Standard Model is a rimfire semi-automatic pistol introduced in 1949 as the first product manufactured by Sturm, Ruger & Co., and was the founding member of a product line of .22 Long Rifle cartridge handguns, including its later iterations: the MK II, MK III, and MK IV.  It is marketed as an inexpensive .22 caliber rimfire intended for casual sport and target shooting, and plinking.  Designed by company founder William B. Ruger, the Standard model and its offspring went on to become the most accepted and successful .22 caliber semi-automatic pistols ever produced.

Development

Sometime in the years following World War II firearm designer and entrepreneur Bill Ruger acquired a pair of World War II Japanese Nambu pistols from a returning US Marine, which he successfully duplicated in his garage.  Using the Nambu's silhouette and bolt system, Ruger produced his first prototype, but lacked the venture capital necessary to fund its introduction.  When his affluent friend and potential financial backer Alex Sturm was shown the 1949 prototype Ruger had created, he was impressed by its sleek traditional aesthetic and its slight resemblance to the classic nostalgia-evoking German Luger P08 pistol.

Realizing that prospective buyers would share his sentiment, Sturm quickly signed on board with an initial investment of $50,000 and the two teamed up to create what was to become an iconic American firearms manufacturing company, Sturm, Ruger & Co. 
Ruger's new product was simply christened the "Standard" model.  Intended as a low-cost recreation and sporting product for outdoor, hunting and firearms enthusiasts, Ruger pioneered a number of simple and innovative manufacturing techniques used in the production of the new pistol, including using piano wire coiled springs in the lockwork in lieu of the flat springs most manufacturers were using at the time, and forming the receivers from two stamped sheet metal halves welded together.

These practices worked well with a firearm which needed to handle only .22 rimfire pressures, and the cost savings it produced allowed Sturm and Ruger to radically undersell the competition which still used older and more expensive manufacturing techniques. Financier Sturm, an amateur heraldry aficionado, made his own contribution in the form of the company's trademark "Red Eagle" coat of arms emblem, which was featured as a medallion on the left grip panel. A favorable review published in the American Rifleman magazine penned by the notable firearms authority Major General Julian S. Hatcher, coupled with a subdued advertisement printed in the same magazine resulted in a great deal of interest from the public. The suggested retail price for the new pistol was a reasonable and very competitive $37.50 US.

Checks from would-be purchasers soon rolled in, but as Ruger was firmly entrenched in the "old school" of financial responsibility, none were cashed until pistols actually shipped, setting a standard for "in the black" operation which would serve the company well in the future. In a few months the seed money was all spent, but by then the first 100 Standard pistols had been built and distributed to the initial purchasers.

From the time of its introduction in the fall of 1949, the new pistol was a success, and though it faced competition from the beginning, it soon dominated a large share of the rimfire pistol market segment. Unfortunately Alex Sturm did not survive to see the corporation's ultimate success, suffering an untimely demise from viral hepatitis in November 1951. In memorial and as a mark of respect and bereavement, Ruger ordered the background of Sturm's eagle emblem changed from red to black on future production models of the popular and successful firearm they produced and marketed together.

The Standard model was under constant production in basically the same form for the next 33 years, but the new corporation expanded the basic Standard archetype into a product line of pistols over time by the introduction of a number of variant models. These took the form of offering additional barrel lengths and configurations, creating versions optimized for target shooting, and adding the finish option of stainless steel. The line was also refined with three mechanical "MK" series upgrades, the Mk II,  Mk III and Mk IV, in 1982, 2004 and 2016  The MK II added a slide stop that held the slide open on the last round, and also was available in stainless steel. All guns with bull or heavy tapered barrels are Target models, and are equipped with target sights consisting of an adjustable rear sight and a taller, wider front sight, with an aggressive undercut to reduce glare. In 1999 18 versions of this popular pistol could be found in the Sturm Ruger catalog, and with over 2 million sold it eventually became the most prolific and well-liked .22 automatic pistol of all time.

Criminal use
The Ruger Standard was used in several notable crimes:
 Patrick Sherril used a Ruger MK II among other firearms in the Edmond post office shooting in 1986 and killed 14 people and injured 6 more.
 Michael Carneal used a Ruger Mark II in the Heath High School shooting in 1997 and killed 3 people and injured 5 more.
 Kip Kinkel used a Ruger Mark II among other firearms in the Thurston High School shooting in 1998 and killed 4 people and injured 25 more.
 Marcus Wesson used a Ruger MK II to Murder his 9 children in 2004.
 Jeff Weiss used a Ruger Mark II among other firearms in the 2005 Red Lake shootings and killed 9 people and injured 5 more, which revived the public discussion about the use of Prozac for children and adolescents; the Food and Drug Administration had published a warning about it in October 2004 as a factor in increased suicides and violence among youths.
 T.J. Lane used a Ruger MK III in the Chardon High School shooting in 2012 and killed 3 people and injured 3 more.
 Gabriel Ross Parker used a Ruger MK II in the 2018 Marshall County High School shooting, killing two people and injuring 14 more.

Features

Standard (1949-1982)

The Standard model is an atypical design, lacking the slide found on conventional pistols, instead sporting a cylindrical bolt which cycles inside a tubular receiver in a manner more characteristic of a rimfire rifle. The bolt of the pistol features protruding "ears" at its rear which are grasped and pulled rearward to feed the initial round and cock the action. Using the basic blowback form of operation, the Standard model originally came with a blued carbon steel finish and was equipped with a  tapered barrel.

The magazine held 9 rounds of .22 Long Rifle ammunition and was held in place by a catch on the bottom of the grip frame. Standard models came with Patridge style fixed iron open sights with the rear sight securely mounted in a dovetail. The grip panels were hard black checkered Butaprene synthetic rubber, with pre-1950 pistols featuring the "Red Eagle" trademark as originally designed by Alex Sturm. The manual safety on the Standard model could be engaged only when the pistol was cocked, and the bolt could be locked open by activating the safety with the bolt held back.

The bolt was left "in the white" with the unfinished steel providing a visual contrast with the blued receiver. In 1954 a new model with a barrel length of 6 inches was added to the Standard lineup. In 1971, one of the few engineering changes ever made to the Standard model took place when the original 22-year-old receiver forming dies wore out. As a precursor to changes to come with the 1982 introduction of the MK II series, the slot for the magazine follower extension on the grip frame was moved from the right to the left side.

Designated the "A 100" frame modification, this alteration facilitated the eventual improvement of the Standard pistol by the addition of a bolt hold open device as part of the eventual MK II upgrade. The pistol grip panels and magazines from older Standard models can not be used on post-1971 pistols due to this change, but the later magazines can still be used on pre-1971 guns by moving the magazine follower button to the opposite side. As the Standard model reached the end of its product lifecycle in 1981, a special edition run of 5000 4.75-inch pistols built of stainless steel were manufactured. These pistols were shipped in special wooden cases and featured an engraving of Bill Ruger's signature.

MK I Target (1950–1982)

Introduced in 1950, the MK I Target model was basically the same as the Standard pistol, except that it boasted a  barrel, adjustable target style trigger, a "Micro" adjustable rear sight, and a front sight blade undercut to reduce glare. In 1952, a  barreled version of the MK I Target was added to the lineup, but manufactured only through 1957, making it a collectible rarity today. A  heavy bull barreled version of the MK I Target became available in 1963, eventually becoming the most popular length for Ruger Target MK pistols. Like their Standard model brethren, target models underwent the A 100 grip frame redesign in 1971.

MK II

The MK II ("Mark Two") was made from 1982 to 2005. It replaced the Standard, Ruger's first model, made from 1949 to 1982, and the MK I Target, made from 1951 to 1982. MK II variations include the Target models, which have heavier barrels and adjustable sights, and the 22/45 models, which have a polymer frame with a grip-angle that matches the Colt 1911 rather than the steel frame's Luger P08–like layout.  Three barrel types were available. Taper barrels were available in ″,″, 6″, and ″ lengths, and could be equipped with fixed sights in any length or adjustable sights on 6″ and ″ length barrels. Bull barrels were available on the Mark II in ″, ″, and 10″ lengths and all had adjustable sights. The slab-sided target models were available with ″ and ″ barrels and had adjustable sights. All Ruger Mark II pistols were available in either a blued finish or stainless steel except for the slab side Target Models, which only came in stainless. The MK II was removed from production in 2004, when it was replaced by the MK III.  All Ruger rimfire pistols are chambered in .22 Long Rifle only.

Variants

Some special variants that command higher prices are the Government Target Model, a model that was used for pistol training and competition by the United States Army, and the Red Eagle models, which were made from 1949 to the year of company co-founder Alexander Sturm's death, in 1951. The Red Eagle models had the Ruger logo in red on a silver background. Since then, the Ruger logo on the grip panels has been either black on silver or silver on black, with the exception of a special 50th Anniversary model that had a silver eagle on a red background. The top-of-the-line Government Target Model comes with a  bull barrel and wood thumb-rest target grips. The competition Target Model is identical to the Government Target Model with the addition feature of flats cut along each side of the barrel to reduce weight. Sometime during the span of Mark II production, Ruger started drilling its receivers for and providing a low profile scope base, and 1″ scope rings. With the addition of a pistol scope or red dot sight, these make ideal entry level bullseye pistol.

The suppressed Mk II was used by United States Navy SEALs.

The AWC TM-Amphibian "S" is an integrally-suppressed variant of the Ruger Mk II Target .22 LR pistol. The sound suppressor uses a primary baffle of 303 stainless steel and a secondary baffle of 6061-T6 aluminum alloy. The AWC weapon manual states, "This suppressor is 'Amphibious' and can be fired with water. A couple of tablespoons of water can be poured into the suppressor for extra quiet operation." It uses both standard and high velocity ammunition reliably and is finished in U.S. Navy spec stainless-matte finish. This weapon is classified in the U.S. as a Title II weapon and requires a $200 transfer or manufacture tax in addition to registration with the ATF.

MK III

The MK III ("Mark Three") is the third-generation successor to the original Ruger Standard. The MK III replaced the MK II in 2004, and production of the MK III ended on December 8, 2016; it was succeeded by the MK IV.

Changes from the Mark II
 Addition of a visible loaded chamber indicator on the left side.
 Magazine release moved, from bottom of the grip to behind trigger guard.
 All Mark III pistols with adjustable sights are drilled and tapped for a Weaver-style scope base which ships with the pistol.
 A new magazine disconnect prevents the pistol from being fired with the magazine removed from the pistol.
 An internal safety lock has been added. Using a key, the safety can be locked in the "safe" position.
 Shorter tapered bolt ears.
 A smoothly contoured ejection port profile.

Models

Two types of MK III pistols were produced.

Mark III

The first lineup is simply known as Mark III. The pistol's barrel is made from steel bar and is threaded into the receiver which is made from steel tube. The barrel is not removable without machining, though. The layout is similar to the Luger P08, although the operating mechanism was originally copied from the Nambu pistol.

 The high-end model is known as the Hunter. This pistol features a stainless steel frame and comes with either a 4.5-inch, 5.5-inch (a distributor exclusive), or a 6.875-inch fluted bull barrel, fiber-optic front sight, adjustable, V-notch rear sights, and half-checkered cocobolo wood grip. It features multiple safety mechanisms, and includes a visible loaded chamber indicator (The first ever included in a .22 rimfire pistol) as well as internal and external keyed locks provided.
 The next pistol in the lineup is named Competition. It too has a stainless steel frame and 6.875-inch slab sided bull barrel, and adjustable rear sights; the pistol also has the cocobolo grip with thumb rest.
 Target is the next Mark III. This pistol has a stainless or blued finish, a 5.5" bull barrel, adjustable rear sights, and black plastic grips on the blued finish and Cocobolo grips on the stainless finish.
 The bull barrel pistol comes in stainless steel or blued finish. It has a heavier barrel to help keep the barrel from overheating and to minimize recoil. It has a 5.5-inch barrel and adjustable rear sights.
 Finally, the Standard Mark III has a tapered barrel, black plastic handgrips and a blued finish. It comes with either a 6-inch or 4.75-inch barrel.  It has fixed sights.

Mark III 22/45

The second lineup is named Mark III 22/45. These pistols have a polymer frame, and the steel barrel is installed nearly permanently into a tubular steel receiver. The grip angle emulates that of a M1911.

 The current high-end model, the Mk III 22/45 Lite, was introduced at the 2012 SHOT Show. The main features include a light-weight aluminum upper receiver, material reduction on the upper receiver for enhanced appearance and further weight savings, a steel barrel that has been threaded "-28 for a compensator or suppressor, and user replaceable grips. Finally, the receiver of the Lite model is drilled and tapped for a Weaver rail section included in the packaging.
 The previous high-end model is known as the Hunter. This pistol features a stainless steel 4.5-inch or 6.875-inch fluted bull barrel, HiViz fiber optic front sight, and adjustable rear sights. This model was discontinued for 2012.
 The Target pistol comes in a few different variations. It has a heavier barrel to limit overheating, reduce recoil, and increase accuracy.
 Stainless steel 5.5-inch barrel and adjustable rear sights (Discontinued in 2012).
 Blued finish with 5.5-inch barrel and adjustable rear sights.
 Blued finish with 4-inch barrel and adjustable rear sights.
 Blued finish with 5.5-inch barrel, fixed rear sights, and replaceable Checkered Cocobolo grips.
 Several models previously sold as Bull Barrel and Slab Side models had their names changed or were entirely discontinued when Ruger changed their catalog to reflect the Target lineup.
 The Threaded Barrel models are very similar in configuration to the Target models, but with a threaded barrel for the addition of a compensator or suppressor. These models also feature user replaceable grips and the option of either adjustable target sights or Picatinny rails.
 Distributor Exclusive models are specially made versions of the Mk III 22/45 released through certain distributors. For the 2012 lineup, these models include:
 A Target model with a "Water Dog" Brown Digital Camo lower receiver.
 A Target model with a fluted barrel and adjustable rear sights.
 A Target model with a fluted barrel and adjustable fiber optic rear sights.

MK IV

The MK IV ("Mark Four") is the fourth-generation successor to the original Ruger Standard. Introduced in 2016, the MK IV succeeded the MK III.

Changes from the Mark III 
The most significant feature of the Mk IV redesign is a hinged connection between the upper receiver and the grip frame.  This design enables the user to disassemble the firearm with a significantly simplified process compared to prior models.

Other design changes include: a redesigned trigger group, a redesigned bolt stop, an ambidextrous thumb safety, and a "drop free" magazine release mechanism.

Safety recall
In June 2017, Ruger issued a safety recall on MK IVs for a defective trigger and safety mechanism.  If the safety were midway between the "safe" and "fire" positions when the trigger was pulled, the gun could discharge when the safety was moved to the "fire" position.  MK IVs with serial numbers beginning with "401" (2017 models) or "WBR" (2016 models) were recalled.

Models 

 Standard
 Target
 Hunter
 Competition
 Tactical
 22/45
 22/45 Lite
 22/45 Tactical

 Distributor exclusive models

See also
 AMT Lightning pistol
 Colt Woodsman

References

 Wilson, R. L. Ruger and His Guns: A History of the Man, the Company and Their Firearms. 1996. .

External links
 History and Instruction Manuals—Ruger's instruction manuals
 Mark II Manual—Ruger Mark II manual with parts list and exploded assembly diagram
  Ruger-produced Disassembly video
 Ruger-produced Reassembly video
 Field Stripping—guide to field stripping the MK II pistol, with images
 Assembly/Disassembly—guide to full assembly/disassembly
 Overtravel—How to adjust the overtravel screw on a Ruger MK II Target model
 Ruger MK III Instruction Manual (PDF)

.22 LR pistols
Ruger semi-automatic pistols
Semi-automatic pistols of the United States
Weapons and ammunition introduced in 1949